The Monroe Expressway, designated U.S. Route 74 Bypass (US 74 Byp.), is a  controlled-access toll road in Union County in the U.S. state of North Carolina, the first in the Charlotte area. It serves as a bypass of the communities of Indian Trail, Monroe, and Wingate for U.S. Route 74 (US 74), running generally parallel to the route.

Route description

The Monroe Expressway begins at a partial interchange which only provides access from eastbound and to westbound US 74 as well as Stallings Road and Marie Garris Drive. It heads northeast through a mixed-use suburban area, turning to the southeast around Lake Park at a folded diamond interchange with Indian Trail Fairview Road. This interchange allows westbound Monroe Expressway traffic to indirectly access US 74 eastbound. Continuing further southeast into a rural area, the freeway runs parallel to Secrest Short Cut Road, meeting Unionville Indian Trail Road and Rocky River Road. The freeway and Secrest Short Cut Road diverge as the former meets US 601 at a partial cloverleaf interchange north of Monroe. The road then intersects North Carolina Highway 200 (NC 200) at a folded diamond interchange, turning east-southeast away from Monroe and then due east. The town of Wingate is served by an interchange with Austin Chaney Road before the Monroe Expressway turns south-southeast to its eastern terminus at another partial interchange with US 74 just west of Marshville, only allowing access to eastbound and from westbound US 74.

History
The Monroe Expressway was initially proposed as two separate projects: the Monroe Bypass and Monroe Connector. The original environmental planning process for the Monroe Bypass concluded in 1997, including a preferred alternative. The road would have begun near the intersection of US 74 and Rocky River Road, running northeast to the current location of the Monroe Expressway near Secrest Short Cut Road. From here, it would have followed the current alignment of the road to its terminus at US 74 between Wingate and Marshville. The project was divided into three sections: Section A from US 74 (western terminus) to US 601, Section B from US 601 to Richardson Creek, and Section C from Richardson Creek to US 74 (eastern terminus). After a public meeting, planning for Section A was suspended and the Monroe Connector was proposed to directly connect the bypass to I-485.

Planning for the Monroe Connector began in 1999, with a draft environmental impact statement (EIS) issued on October 17, 2003. Among the alternatives considered were simply upgrading US 74 to a freeway or building the road on a new alignment, as well as various locations to connect to I-485, including the existing interchange with US 74. In 2005, the North Carolina Turnpike Authority considered building the Connector as a toll road at the request of the Mecklenburg–Union Metropolitan Planning Organization (MUMPO). Meanwhile, NCDOT continued to develop the Monroe Bypass project separately.

With the original environmental studies for the Monroe Bypass almost 10 years old, the Federal Highway Administration required NCDOT to reevaluate the documents before starting construction. All three sections would need to be included in the reevaluation in order for the road to function as a stand-alone bypass. However, MUMPO's 2030 Long Range Transportation Plan (LRTP) omitted Section A in favor of the Monroe Connector. With inclusion in the LRTP required for FHWA approval, and the Monroe Connector and Sections B and C of the Monroe Bypass requiring the other in order to function as a single road, the reevaluation was discontinued so that the two projects could be combined. The final EIS for the combined project issued in August 2010, including the selected alternative of a controlled-access toll road. By 2015, the proposed toll road was officially renamed the Monroe Expressway.

Construction on the Monroe Expressway began in May 2015, with the road finally opening on November 27, 2018.

Tolls
Like the Triangle Expressway in the Triangle area, the Monroe Expressway uses open road tolling along its entire length. Electronic toll gantries are located on the freeway mainline between each interchange so that all motorists will pass through at least one. Motorists without an NC Quick Pass transponder will have their license plate scanned and receive a bill in the mail. Motorists with an NC Quick Pass transponder have the toll automatically deducted from their account and pay a reduced toll rate: approximately 14 cents per mile (8 ¢/km) with a transponder compared to 21 cents (13 ¢/km) without for two-axle vehicles.

, the total toll rate for two-axle vehicles on the length of the freeway is $2.54 for NC Quick Pass users (or compatible electronic tolling systems) and $3.92 for bill-by-mail. Three-axle rates are twice the two-axle rates; four-or-more-axle rates are four times the two-axle rates.

Exit list

See also

References

External links
 NCDOT: Monroe Expressway
 NC Quick Pass: Monroe Expressway

Special routes of the United States Numbered Highway System
U.S. Route 74
Transportation in Union County, North Carolina
U.S. Highways in North Carolina